O.H.M.S. (US title You're in the Army Now) is a 1937 British adventure film directed by Raoul Walsh and starring Wallace Ford, John Mills, Anna Lee and Grace Bradley. The film score was composed by Jack Beaver.

Plot 

An American gangster evades the New York Police's pursuit of him for a murder he didn't commit by fleeing to England with the victim's papers, having assumed his identity. Once in England he joins the British Army and finds romance and adventure on campaign in China.

Cast
 Wallace Ford as Jimmy Tracy
 John Mills as Corporal Bert Dawson
 Anna Lee as Sally Briggs
 Grace Bradley as Jean Burdett
 Frank Cellier as RSM Briggs
 Peter Croft as Student
 Frederick Leister as Vice-Consul
 Atholl Fleming as	Military Instructor (uncredited)

Production 

Seeking to use cinema to counter the anti-militarist and pacifistic public atmosphere that predominated in the late 1930s in England, and foster an Anglo-American spirit on either side of the Atlantic Ocean in the prelude to the outbreak of World War II, the Gaumont British Picture Corporation engaged the American Director Raoul Walsh, and the Anglo-American star Wallace Ford to produce a film showing life in the British Army in an entertaining and positive light, in the same manner that Walsh had done for the United States Marines Corps in What Price Glory?.

The film was shot at Gainsborough Studios in London, and renamed You're in the Army Now! for its American release. The film's sets were designed by the art director Edward Carrick.

References

External links

1937 films
British comedy films
British war films
British adventure films
1937 comedy films
Films directed by Raoul Walsh
Films set in China
Films set in New York City
Films set in England
Films scored by Jack Beaver
British black-and-white films
1930s English-language films
1930s British films